The San Jose crime family, also known as the Cerrito crime family or San Jose Mafia, was one of the two families that controlled organized crime in San Jose, California, within the nationwide criminal organization known as the Mafia (or La Cosa Nostra). The other family that ran organized crime in San Jose was the Bonanno crime family of New York.

History

Early history
In the early 1940s Onofrio Sciortino founded the first probable organized crime in San Jose, California. Sciortino would derive a majority of his profits from loansharking, gambling, counterfeiting, shylocking, prostitution and extortion. He would rule over the San Jose area from the early 1940s until his death on September 10, 1959.

Cerrito and the Bonanno family

Joseph Cerrito took over the crime family after the death of Sciortino. Cerrito emigrated to the United States from Palermo, Sicily in the late 1920s and eventually settled in San Jose in the early 1940s. He owned three car dealerships in the San Jose area. Cerrito gained some popularity for being caught at the 1957 mob meeting in Apalachin, New York. In 1964, he was spotted meeting Bonanno crime family former underboss Frank Garofalo at a hotel in Palermo, Sicily. Many believe they were discussing the war within the Bonanno Family. Life Magazine listed Cerrito as the Mafia boss of San Jose in 1968. Angry over the accusation, he sued the company for libel. But the case was later thrown out of court. Cerrito died in 1978 from natural causes.

Leadership under Marino
A loyal caporegime named Angelo Marino was selected as the new boss over the San Jose rackets in 1978. Marino had close connections with San Francisco mayor Joseph Alioto (served 1968–1974), Marino was close with San Francisco crime family boss James Lanza and Los Angeles consigliere and FBI informant Frank Bompensiero. He owned and operated the California Cheese Company. His father, Salvatore, a longtime member of the Pittsburgh crime family, handed the company to Marino. His company controlled eighty-five percent of the cheese distribution in California and fifty percent west of the Mississippi River. Marino brought over many Sicilian immigrants to work in his cheese factory.
 
Marino was indicted in October 1977 with his son Salvatore for the murder of Peter Catelli. Peter Catelli had tried to get a job with Marino's company. When Marino refused him a position, Catelli tried to extort $100,000 from Marino. Angelo Marino ordered Catelli's father Orlando to kill him in a trailer on the north side of the California Cheese factory. Orlando refused, and Salvatore then killed Peter and shot Orlando in the head. Orlando survived and testified against the Marinos.

Marino avoided trial for the next three years by claiming illness, but he continued to operate the crime family from a hospital. Joseph Piazza and Thomas Napolitano were also arrested for participating in the attack. On October 12, 1980 Angelo Marino was convicted of second-degree murder and attempted murder. His conviction was overturned on appeals and he was released. Angelo Marino died of a congestive heart failure due to diabetes in February 1983.

Figlia as Boss
Emmanuel J. Figlia was the boss over the remaining crime family. He was considered an underboss to Marino. In 1998 Salvatore Marino, son of the previously mentioned Angelo, was released from San Quentin Prison. The crime family took a large blow after the deaths of Frank Maestri and Vito Frank Adragna. Adragna died on April 7, 2008, he was 90. Figlia died of natural causes on September 25, 2009.

Current status
Emmanuel Joseph Figlia was the boss over the remaining Cerrito Crime Family from 1983 to 1995. Salvatore "Sal" Marino was released from San Quentin Prison in 1998 and is said to have taken over the crime family. Figlia died on September 25, 2009. He was 91 years old. They also lost Vito Frank Adragna a year earlier. Adragna was a consigliere in the crime family. There has been an increase of Asian and Mexican gangs located where the former position of the Cerrito crime family was. The family is now believed to be defunct.

Historical leadership

Boss
1940s–1959 — Onofrio Sciortino — died on September 10, 1959
1959–1978 — Joseph Cerrito — died
1978–1983 — Angelo Marino — died February 1983
1983–2009 — Emmanuel J. Figlia — died on September 25, 2009

Underboss
1959–1983 — Emmanuel J. Figlia — became boss

See also
 Bonanno crime family
 San Francisco crime family
 Pittsburgh crime family
 Italian-American Mafia

References

Further reading
 DeMaris, Ovid. The Last Mafioso: Aladino "Jimmy the Weasel" Fratianno. New York: Bantam Books, 1981. 
 Capeci, Jerry. The Complete Idiot's Guide To The Mafia. New York: Alpha Books, 2001. 
 Lavigne, Yves. Hell's Angels. Yves Lavigne, 2000. 
 Mannion, James. The Everything Mafia Book''. Adams Media, 2003.

Criminals of the San Francisco Bay Area
Italian-American crime families
Gangs in California